Gürer (literally "strong (gür) man (er)") is a Turkish surname and male given name and may refer to:

 Cevat Abbas Gürer (1887–1943), Turkish actress and singer
 Gürer Aykal (born 1942), Turkish conductor

Turkish masculine given names
Turkish-language surnames
Surnames from nicknames